George H. Munroe (September 24, 1844–February 1, 1912) was an American businessman and politician.

Munroe was born in Jefferson County, New York. In 1849, Munroe moved to Illinois with his parents. He went to the public schools. In 1862, Munroe moved to Joliet, Illinois. He was involved with the grocery business in Joliet. Munroe also was involved in the real estate and mortgage loan business. Munroe served in the Illinois Senate from 1895 to 1899 and was a Republican. Munroe died suddenly from a stroke while he was in his bathroom at  his winter home in Daytona, Florida. He was an orange grower in Florida.

Notes

External links

1844 births
1912 deaths
People from Jefferson County, New York
People from Joliet, Illinois
Businesspeople from Illinois
Farmers from Florida
Republican Party Illinois state senators
Accidental deaths in Florida